Any kind of logic, function, expression, or theory based on the work of George Boole is considered Boolean.  

Related to this, "Boolean" may refer to:

 Boolean data type, a form of data with only two possible values (usually "true" and "false")
 Boolean algebra, a logical calculus of truth values or set membership
 Boolean algebra (structure), a set with operations resembling logical ones
 Boolean domain, a set consisting of exactly two elements whose interpretations include false and true
 Boolean circuit, a mathematical model for digital logical circuits.
 Boolean expression, an expression in a programming language that produces a Boolean value when evaluated
 Boolean function, a function that determines Boolean values or operators
 Boolean model (probability theory), a model in stochastic geometry
 Boolean network, a certain network consisting of a set of Boolean variables whose state is determined by other variables in the network
 Boolean processor, a 1-bit variable computing unit 
 Boolean ring, a mathematical ring for which x2 = x for every element x
 Boolean satisfiability problem,  the problem of determining if there exists an interpretation that satisfies a given Boolean formula
 Boolean prime ideal theorem, a theorem which states that ideals in a Boolean algebra can be extended to prime ideals

See also
Binary (disambiguation)

Broad-concept articles
Computer science